Comic Relief Does The Apprentice (also known as The Celebrity Apprentice for Comic Relief) is a special celebrity version of British reality television series The Apprentice, initially produced to raise money for Comic Relief. The first edition aired in March 2007. In 2008, the same format was broadcast until the title Sport Relief Does The Apprentice. Each series involves five male and five female celebrities competing in a single Apprentice task.

Just weeks before the show aired in early 2007, it was spoofed in the television programme Kombat Opera Presents The Applicants.

Comic Relief

Series 1 (2007) 

The series first aired on BBC One on 15 March 2007 and concluded on 16 March 2007 during the main Comic Relief programme The first episode of the show received strong viewing figures of 6.72 million. It became the fifth most watched programme on BBC One that week.

Men's Team

Women's Team – Winners

Performance chart

 The candidate won as project manager on his/her team, for this task.
 The candidate lost as project manager on his/her team, for this task.
 The candidate was on the winning team for this task.
 The candidate was on the losing team for this task.
 The candidate was brought to the final boardroom for this task.
 The candidate was fired in this task.
 The candidate left the competition prior to this task.

Results
The women won in the categories "ticket sales" and "food and drinks", as well as claiming the overall win in terms of total money raised, while the men managed to pull off a victory in the "rides" category. Together, the teams raised over a million pounds for charity.

Everett walked off the show during filming on the first day, as he was uncomfortable with the Big Brother style experience. He was replaced by the first UK Apprentice Tim Campbell. Radio host Chris Moyles was asked to appear as a contestant, but declined the offer.

Overview
The task allocated during the show was to run a funfair. The team which produced the most money for Comic Relief via ticket, food, and ride sales would win. The teams were then gathered at Alan Sugar's office and briefed on the task ahead. The girls chose Karren Brady as their team leader, and the boys chose Alastair Campbell.

The celebrities were then given a list of all rides and attractions that would be offered at the funfair, leaving the teams to bargain over who would get which rides. The teams then called and visited celebrities to sell tickets and gain donations. The largest donation for a ticket was £150,000 from a friend of Trinny Woodall.

Celebrities who attended the funfair and donated money included Simon Cowell, McFly, Ashley Cole, Anne Robinson, Tracey Emin, Chris Evans, David Furnish, Peter Stringfellow, Girls Aloud, Geri Halliwell, Take That, Jesse Metcalfe and John Terry.

In the end, both teams raised a total of over £1 million for Comic Relief.  The girls' team won the competition by raising £774,000 compared to the boys' £286,000. As a result of the girls' team winning, Danny Baker, Piers Morgan, and the boys' team leader Alastair Campbell were put forward to potentially be fired by Sir Alan Sugar. In a heated exchange, Alastair Campbell and Piers Morgan blamed each other for their failure at the task. Sir Alan Sugar decided that Piers Morgan was more at fault due to his "winding people up" with his "demeanor" and consequently 'fired' him.

Jo Brand commented on The Graham Norton Show after the airing of the programme that "Trinny Woodall knows everyone in Belgravia who earns more than £10 million a year so she got on the phone and the rest of us just went to the pub, it was great!".

Series 2 (2009)

A second series of Comic Relief Does The Apprentice was aired on 12 and 13 March 2009. The first episode received 7.94 million viewers, with a 33% audience share.

Men's Team

Women's Team – Winners

The show was filmed in late 2008. Jonathan Ross had been suspended by the BBC for three months for his part in the telephone pranks on Andrew Sachs' regarding Sachs' granddaughter in October and had been forbidden to film anything during that time, however since he had previously agreed and since it was for charity, the BBC allowed him to participate.

Sugar expressed disappointment about his portrayal in the BBC trailer for the programme, telling the Daily Mirror, "The idiot that edited it [...] went through the past five years of archive to find snapshots of me roaring like a deranged lunatic and just stuck them all together." He threatened to quit the series if it happened again.

Performance chart

 The candidate won as project manager on his/her team, for this task.
 The candidate lost as project manager on his/her team, for this task.
 The candidate was on the winning team for this task.
 The candidate was on the losing team for this task.
 The candidate was brought to the final boardroom for this task.
 The candidate was fired in this task.

Overview
The task was to create a toy and market it at a show attended by Sir Alan and toy industry representatives, with the potential for it to be mass-produced and sold to raise money for Comic Relief. The men's team, led by Gerald Ratner, created a belt with clip-on slots to hold collectible figurines, that was suggested by Jonathan Ross. The women's team created a velcro suit that was intended to come in pairs and played somewhat like Twister, including a giant novelty dice that when rolled, instructed players to stick one part of their body to the other player's, with the loser being whoever fell to the floor first. Both teams suffered internal conflicts, with Jonathan Ross forcing many of his ideas through and then not contributing to the speech that he was supposed to be writing with Jack Dee, while Patsy Palmer became frustrated with Michelle Mone's leadership of their team and very nearly quit. Conflict between Dee and Ross was presented by the BBC in a humorous fashion, and it is likely that both Dee and Ross 'played up' their conflict to entertain the viewer.

The men's presentation was felt to be better, and Sir Alan told the girls that their product suffered from a myriad of small flaws such as the dice being largely needless, and the suits being in blue and pink when children often prefer to play among their own gender (although the girls pointed out that the prototyping company had made that decision without consulting their team). However, it was pointed out that the collectables for the men's belt would have such high initial production costs that it would require a significant manufacturing lead time and would take an even longer time for the product to generate any profits (and thereby money for Comic Relief), meaning that while the men's execution of their task may have been better than the women's, and their product may have been the better of the two if it were being judged on a purely business basis, as a charity product it was completely worthless for Comic Relief's purposes, meaning that they lost the task. The women's team were "rewarded" by not having to work for Sir Alan any more (and, since this was the final Apprentice charity special, it meant the women's teams had a 100% victory rate across all three editions).

As the men's team lost the contest, one of them was going to be fired by Sir Alan.  As project manager, Ratner had to choose 2 of his team to join him in the boardroom to face the board.  Ratner decided that Wan and Ross had made the greatest contribution to the team and so should not face the sack. During the deliberations in the board room, Jack Dee attempted to convince Sir Alan to fire his advisor Nick Hewer on the comical grounds that Nick had contributed nothing, and had taken money from Dee and bribed him. While Ratner was heavily criticised for allowing Ross to take over the entire task and bringing Dee back instead of him, Alan Carr was eventually fired by Sir Alan, who felt that Carr had been the least effective contributor to the task and said he was doing Alan a favour by saving him from the miserable atmosphere of the boardroom.

Series 3 (2019)

On 22 February 2019, it was announced that Comic Relief Does The Apprentice would return after a ten-year hiatus. Two episodes, The Cabaret Task and The Boardroom, aired on the 7 and 8 March 2019 respectively.

Men's Team

Women's Team

Performance chart

 The candidate won as project manager on his/her team, for this task.
 The candidate lost as project manager on his/her team, for this task.
 The candidate was on the winning team for this task.
 The candidate was on the losing team for this task.
 The candidate was brought to the final boardroom for this task.
 The candidate was fired in this task.

Sport Relief

Series 1 (2008) 
A Sport Relief edition aired on BBC One on 12 and 14 March 2008.

Women's Team

Men's team

Performance chart

 The candidate won as project manager on his/her team, for this task.
 The candidate lost as project manager on his/her team, for this task.
 The candidate was on the winning team for this task.
 The candidate was on the losing team for this task.
 The candidate was brought to the final boardroom for this task.
 The candidate was fired in this task.

Overview

Women: Jacqueline Gold (Project Manager), Kirstie Allsopp, Clare Balding, Louise Redknapp, Lisa Snowdon.
Men: Lembit Öpik (Project Manager), Hardeep Singh Kohli (Project Manager), Nick Hancock, Kelvin MacKenzie, Phil Tufnell.
Result: The women's team worked together efficiently and harmoniously for the most part, though Kirstie Allsopp stormed out of a planning session on the first night, feeling that project manager Jacqueline Gold wasn't properly exploiting Kirstie's contacts list. By contrast, the men's team was in complete chaos for most of the task. Hardeep Singh Kohli initially voltuneered to lead the men, but after half an hour the other men began complaining about his overly autocratic leadership style, and when Kelvin MacKenzie off-handedly told him that "You're not flamin' Hitler," Hardeep flew into a rage, demanded that filming be stopped and threatened to walk off the show. He ultimately agreed to stay, but refused to continue as project manager and was replaced by Lembit Öpik. By the end of the first day of the task, the women already had over £100,000 pledged to their team, but the men had no pledges whatsoever. By the final day it looked as if the men were heading for a humiliating defeat, as the women continued to secure large donations, while the men had earned very little. Near the end of the day the men were given a last-gasp chance at victory, as Kelvin's contact, Tamara Ecclestone persuaded her father Bernie Ecclestone to attend their event, and he made the biggest donation earned by either of the teams. Unfortunately for the men, the gap was too big to make up and they ended up with £316,013, while the women made £412,121, winning them the task.
Winner: The women's team
Brought into the boardroom: Lembit Öpik, Kelvin MacKenzie and Hardeep Singh Kohli
Fired: Hardeep Singh Kohli – for quitting as project manager early in the task, which plunged the men's team into a state of disarray that they were never able to recover from. In addition, he was also judged to have been difficult to work with after stepping down, and brought in the least amount of money in the task.
Notes:
 Despite claiming that Nick Hancock and Phil Tufnell had spent most of the day joking around with each other and hadn't brought much in, Lembit Öpik decided to bring back Hardeep Singh Kohli and Kelvin MacKenzie, largely due to their argument on the first day. While Sir Alan didn't feel that Lembit had been an especially good project manager, he conceded that the task would likely have ended up in an even worse failure with anyone else leading the men.
 Kelvin MacKenzie was heavily criticised for his part in sending the team into so much chaos on the first day of the task, and also accused of taking a backseat considering he should have had the biggest contacts list of the celebrities.

See also
 The Apprentice
 Comic Relief
 Comic Relief Does Fame Academy

References

External links

BBC Red Nose Day website''

2007 television specials
The Apprentice (British TV series)
Comic Relief
Sport Relief
2009 television specials
2019 television specials
2000s British reality television series
2010s British reality television series
2007 British television series debuts
British television specials
British television spin-offs
BBC reality television shows
Television series by Fremantle (company)
English-language television shows